60th National Board of Review Awards

Best Picture: 
 Mississippi Burning 
The 60th National Board of Review Awards were announced on December 13, 1988, and given on February 27, 1989.

Top 10 films
Mississippi Burning
Dangerous Liaisons
The Accused
The Unbearable Lightness of Being
The Last Temptation of Christ
Tucker: The Man and His Dream
Big
Running on Empty
Gorillas in the Mist
Midnight Run

Top foreign films
Women on the Verge of a Nervous Breakdown
Pelle the Conqueror
Le Grand Chemin
Salaam Bombay! 
A Taxing Woman

Winners

Best Picture: 
Mississippi Burning
Best Foreign Film:
Women on the Verge of a Nervous Breakdown
Best Actor: 
Gene Hackman - Mississippi Burning
Best Actress: 
Jodie Foster - The Accused
Best Supporting Actor: 
River Phoenix - Running on Empty
Best Supporting Actress: 
Frances McDormand - Mississippi Burning
Best Director: 
Alan Parker - Mississippi Burning
Best Documentary
The Thin Blue Line
Career Achievement Award:
Kirk Douglas

References

External links
National Board of Review of Motion Pictures :: Awards for 1988

1988
1988 film awards
1988 in American cinema